Inaperisone (INN) is a muscle relaxant.

See also 
 Chemically and mechanistically related drugs: eperisone, lanperisone, silperisone, tolperisone

References 

Muscle relaxants
Pyrrolidines